Dimitri Nasrallah (born 1977) is a Lebanese Canadian writer and academic. He is most noted for his 2022 novel Hotline, which was longlisted for the 2022 Giller Prize.

Born in Lebanon in the early years of the Lebanese Civil War, Nasrallah's family took refuge in Cyprus and Greece before immigrating to Montreal in 1988. 

His debut novel, Blackbodying, was published in 2004, and was the winner of the McAuslan First Book Prize from the Quebec Writers' Federation Awards in 2005. His second novel, Niko, was published in 2011, and his third novel, The Bleeds, followed in 2018. His latest book, Hotline, published in 2022, was selected for the 2023 edition of Canada Reads, where it will be championed by Gurdeep Pandher.

Nasrallah is also a professor of creative writing at Concordia University, and the chief editor for Esplanade Books, the fiction imprint of Véhicule Press.

Awards and honours

Publications

As author 

 Blackbodying (2004, DC Books)
 Niko (2011, Esplanade Books)
 The Bleeds (2018, Véhicule Press)
 Hotline (2022, Esplanade Books)

As translator 

 Hungary-Hollywood Express by Éric Plamondon (2017, Esplanade Books)
 Mayonnaise by Éric Plamondon (2018, Esplanade Books)

References

1977 births
Living people
21st-century Canadian novelists
21st-century Canadian male writers
Canadian male novelists
Canadian book editors
Lebanese emigrants to Canada
Academic staff of Concordia University
Writers from Montreal